Mickey in Arabia is a 1932 American animated short film produced by Walt Disney Productions and released by Columbia Pictures. This was also the final cartoon in the Mickey Mouse series to be released by Columbia Pictures. Walt Disney plays Mickey Mouse and Marcellite Garner plays Minnie. It was the 43rd Mickey Mouse film released, the seventh of that year. The date of its release is thought to be July 18, 1932, but at least one source gives July 11 as the date.

Plot
Mickey and Minnie are riding camel-back through the Arabian Desert and happen upon a lively town. Dismounting within, the mice take some amusing photographs whilst their naughty camel slurps up the contents of a beer barrel. As Minnie Mouse backs away with her camera from Mickey, who is posing for the shot, a sultan (portrayed as Mickey's nemesis Pete) abducts her from behind a fence.

Mickey takes to the chase, but his intoxicated camel is of little use; finding out the sultan's palace, the mouse scales the wall and, through a window, enters a room in the building, where he finds a screaming Minnie struggling against the amorous villain.  Breaking the sultan's grasp, Mickey becomes the target of the sultan's bullets. He hides Minnie in a flower pot, and prevails, through chance, over the sultan's well-armed men.

Mickey is pursued (while delicately balancing the flower pot in his hands!) by the sultan himself, out the window, up the spiral stairway leading to the palace roof, thence to the next building over, where he drops the pot, only rescuing Minnie from the fall at the building's edge, from which he slips on account of a loose brick.

Minnie and Mickey fall into an awning: the angry sultan, still in pursuit, leaps from the same edge, compelling Mickey to retract the awning, making the sultan's fall considerably less pleasant. The spears of the sultan's warriors, similarly avoided, make their way to the helplessly entombed sultan. The sultan rushes off, in pain, into the distance.  Mickey calls his camel, and, with Minnie, rides off happily.

Voice cast
 Mickey Mouse: Walt Disney
 Minnie Mouse: Marcellite Garner
 Pete: Pinto Colvig
 Camel: ???
 Armed men: ???

Home media
The short was released on December 7, 2004, on Walt Disney Treasures: Mickey Mouse in Black and White, Volume Two: 1929-1935.

See also
Mickey Mouse (film series)

References

External links
 
 

1932 short films
1932 animated films
1932 films
Films set in 1932
1930s Disney animated short films
Films directed by Wilfred Jackson
Films produced by Walt Disney
Films set in the Arabian Peninsula
Films set in palaces
Mickey Mouse short films
American black-and-white films
Columbia Pictures short films
Columbia Pictures animated short films
Films about camels
Films about kidnapping
1930s American films